Roberto Benamati (born 27 June 1960) is an Italian former yacht racer who competed in the 1992 Summer Olympics.

References

External links
 
 

1960 births
Living people
Italian male sailors (sport)
Olympic sailors of Italy
Sailors at the 1992 Summer Olympics – Star
Star class world champions
World champions in sailing for Italy